Sidney Henry Kibrick (born July 2, 1928) is an American former child actor, most notable for appearing in the Our Gang short subjects film series, over a ten-year period from 1933 and 1943.  
 
Kibrick was born in Minneapolis, Minnesota on July 2, 1928. He attended Mount Vernon Junior High. Kibrick made a brief non-dialogue appearance as an extra in the feature film Dead End, observed as one of three or so children huddled together during one of the river dock scenes. He made his uncredited film debut in Out all Night (1933), and after a few more uncredited roles was cast in 1935 in Our Gang, from 1937 to 1939, in that series he portrayed "Woim" (a vernacular pronunciation of "worm"), the sidekick of the neighborhood bully "Butch", played by Tommy Bond.

Kibrick worked as a real estate developer after leaving show business in 1969. He kept in touch with Our Gang members at reunions, some of which he used to host. In 1991, he acknowledged that he had avoided the tragic lives that former child actors often ended up having as adults. In July 2017, he was reported as one of the few surviving cast members of the original Our Gang series.

Filmography

References

External links
 
 
 

1928 births
Living people
20th-century American male actors
American male child actors
Male actors from Minneapolis
Our Gang